Juan Martín del Potro was the defending champion but lost in the quarterfinals to Ernests Gulbis.
Tomáš Berdych won the title, defeating Marin Čilić in the final, 6–4, 6–2.

Seeds

Draw

Finals

Top half

Bottom half

Qualifying

Seeds

 Daniel Brands (qualifying competition, lucky loser)
 Victor Hănescu (qualifying competition)
 Łukasz Kubot (qualifying competition)
 Kenny de Schepper (first round)
 Sergiy Stakhovsky (qualified)
 Peter Gojowczyk (first round, retired)
 Michaël Llodra (withdrew)
 Jan Hájek (first round)

Qualifiers

Lucky loser
  Daniel Brands

Qualifying draw

First qualifier

Second qualifier

Third qualifier

Fourth qualifier

External links
 Main draw
 Qualifying draw

2014 ABN AMRO World Tennis Tournament
ABN AMRO World Tennis Tournament - Men's Singles